"No Time" is a song by Canadian rock band The Guess Who, composed by guitarist Randy Bachman and lead singer Burton Cummings.

There are two versions of the song.  The original recording was done for The Guess Who's album Canned Wheat.  But it is the re-recording (as featured on the American Woman album) that was released as a single in 1969 and is the better-known.  It is slightly faster in tempo and has the two verses transposed, but the extended Bachman guitar solo was cut. The single peaked at No. 5 in the U.S. and was the third in a string of million-selling singles that all hit No. 1 in Canada for The Guess Who.  It also made the Top 20 in the United Kingdom and New Zealand.

Background
The song is basically a reverse Dear John letter stating, "No time left for you." Of the song, Randy Bachman said, “That was our country-rock song... Me and Burton trying to be like Neil and Stephen Stills."

Chart performance

Weekly charts

Year-end charts

Popular culture
This song was used in the movie Pirates of Silicon Valley.

References

External links

1969 songs
1970 singles
The Guess Who songs
Songs written by Randy Bachman
Songs written by Burton Cummings
Song recordings produced by Jack Richardson (record producer)
RPM Top Singles number-one singles
RCA Victor singles
RCA Records singles